Richard Milton Wilson (May 29, 1897 – December 8, 1967) was a professional football player who was an original member of the Green Bay Packers. He played for the Packers beginning in 1919, two years before the team joined the National Football League. His career ended after the 1921 season.

References

Birth of a Team and a Legend
1919-1920 Green Bay Packers

1897 births
1967 deaths
Players of American football from Wisconsin
Green Bay Packers players
Wisconsin–Oshkosh Titans football players